The canton of Iracoubo (French: Canton d'Iracoubo) is one of the former cantons of the Guyane department in French Guiana. It was located in the arrondissement of Cayenne. Its administrative seat was located in Iracoubo, the canton's sole commune. Its population was 1,955 in 2012.

Administration

References 

Iracoubo